NGC 918 is a barred spiral galaxy in the constellation Aries  about 67 million light years from the Milky Way. It was discovered by John Herschel on Jan 11, 1831.

The brightness class of NGC 918 is III and it has a broad line of neutral hydrogen. NGC 918 is also an active nucleus galaxy (AGN). Moreover, it is a field galaxy; that is to say, it does not belong to a cluster or group and is therefore gravitationally isolated.

Many non-redshift measures give a distance of 19,115 ± 6,160 Mpc (~62,3 million ly), which is within the distances calculated using the value shift.

Two supernovae have been observed in this galaxy. SN 2009js was discovered in this galaxy October 11, 2009 at 17.2 magnitude. This was the first subluminous supernova to be studied in infrared wavelengths. Supernova SN 2011ek was discovered on Aug. 4, 2011 by Koichi Itagaki at 16.4 magnitude.

References

External links
 

Barred spiral galaxies
Aries (constellation)
918
009236